The Juno Awards of 1995, representing Canadian music industry achievements of the previous year, were awarded on 26 March 1995 in Hamilton, Ontario at a ceremony in the Copps Coliseum. Mary Walsh, Rick Mercer and other regulars of the television series This Hour Has 22 Minutes were the hosts for the ceremonies, which were broadcast on CBC Television. Almost 10,000 people were in attendance, and over 6,500 public tickets were sold.

Nominees were announced on 1 February 1995. Susan Aglukark and Jann Arden were among the prominent nominees this year. Vancouver rock band 54-40's album Smilin' Buddha Cabaret was accidentally left off the nomination list for Best Alternative Album; after realizing the error, the Academy decided to add them to the category, and rather than remove another band's album simply widened the category to six nominees.

Leonard Rambeau, the long-time manager of Anne Murray, received a special lifetime achievement award; Rambeau died later that year of cancer.

Nominees and winners

Entertainer of the Year
This award was chosen by a national poll rather than by Juno organisers CARAS.

Winner: The Tragically Hip

Other Nominees:
 Celine Dion
 Crash Test Dummies
 Sarah McLachlan
 Neil Young

Female Vocalist of the Year
Winner: Jann Arden

Other Nominees:
 Sass Jordan
 Julie Masse
 Loreena McKennitt
 Michelle Wright

Male Vocalist of the Year
Winner: Neil Young

Other Nominees:
 Bruce Cockburn
 Colin James
 John McDermott
 Roch Voisine

Best New Solo Artist
Winner: Susan Aglukark

Other Nominees:
 Sara Craig
 David Gogo
 Éric Lapointe
 Andrew Matheson

Group of the Year
Winner: The Tragically Hip

Other Nominees:
 Barenaked Ladies
 Crash Test Dummies
 Spirit of the West
 The Watchmen

Best New Group
Winner: Moist

Other Nominees:
 Big Sugar
 Farmer's Daughter
 The Gandharvas
 Wild Strawberries

Songwriter of the Year
Winner: Jann Arden

Other Nominees:
 Bryan Adams
 Greg Keelor and Jim Cuddy
 Joni Mitchell
 Neil Young

Country Female Vocalist of the Year
Winner: Michelle Wright

Other Nominees:
 Lisa Brokop
 Cindy Church
 Patricia Conroy
 Anne Murray

Country Male Vocalist of the Year
Winner: Charlie Major

Other Nominees:
 Joel Feeney
 George Fox
 Terry Kelly
 Jim Witter

Country Group or Duo of the Year
Winner: Prairie Oyster

Other Nominees:
 Coda the West
 Farmer's Daughter
 Prescott-Brown
 Quartette

Instrumental Artist of the Year
Winner: André Gagnon

Other Nominees:
 Hennie Bekker
 Wayne Chaulk
 Marie-Andree Ostiguy
 Quartetto Gelato

Producer of the Year
Winner: Robbie Robertson, "Skin Walker" and "It Is a Good Day to Die" by Robbie Robertson

Other Nominees:
 Arnold Lanni, "Birdman" and "Naveed" by Our Lady Peace
 David Foster, "Power of My Love" and "Colour of My Love" by Celine Dion, "I Swear" and "All-4-One" by All-4-One
 Mark Howard and The Tragically Hip, "Grace, Too", "Day for Night", "Nautical Disaster" by The Tragically Hip
 Pierre Marchand, "Possession", "Stumbling Towards Ecstasy", "Good Enough" by Sarah McLachlan

Recording Engineer of the Year
Winner: Lenny DeRose, "Lay My Body Down" and "Charms" by The Philosopher Kings

Other nominees:
 Mike Fraser, "Push Comes to Shove" by Jackyl and "Deuces Are Wild" by Aerosmith
 Michael Phillip Wojewoda, Music from the Motion Picture Whale Music by Rheostatics
 Marc Ramaer, "Hush Sweet Lover" by k.d. lang and "Jane" by Barenaked Ladies
 Jeff Wolpert, "The Bonny Swans" and "The Dark Night of the Soul" by Loreena McKennitt

Global Achievement Award
Winner: Leonard Rambeau

Canadian Music Hall of Fame
Winner: Buffy Sainte-Marie

Walt Grealis Special Achievement Award
Winner: Louis Applebaum

Nominated and winning albums

Album of the Year
Winner: The Colour of My Love, Celine Dion

Other Nominees:
 Day for Night, The Tragically Hip
 Five Days in July, Blue Rodeo
 Fumbling Towards Ecstasy, Sarah McLachlan
 North Country, The Rankin Family

Best Children's Album
Winner: Bananaphone, Raffi

Other Nominees:
 Eric's World Record, Eric Nagler
 J'ai tant danse, Carmen Campagne
 Jacob Two Two and the Dinosaur, Mordecai Richler
 What a day!, Fred Penner

Best Classical Album (Solo or Chamber Ensemble)
Winner: Erica Goodman Plays Canadian Harp Music, Erica Goodman

Other Nominees:
 Bibor: Instrumental Works, Tafelmusik, musical director Jeanne Lamon
 Gabrielli for Brass, The Canadian Brass
 The Joy of Piano, Valerie Tryon
 Quartetto Gelato, Quartetto Gelato

Best Classical Album (Large Ensemble)
Winner: Bach: Brandenburg Concertos Nos. 1-6, Tafelmusik, director Jeanne Lamon

Other Nominees:
 Ibert: Escales, Flute Concerto, flute Timothy Hutchins, Orchestre symphonique de Montréal, conductor Charles Dutoit
 Shostakovich: Symphonies 1 and 15, Orchestre symphonique de Montréal, conductor Charles Dutoit
 Stravinsky: Apollon Musagete, Sinfonietta de Montréal, conductor Charles Dutoit
 The Romantic Piano Concerto Vol. 7 - Henselt and Alkan, piano Marc-André Hamelin, BBC Scottish Symphony Orchestra, conductor Martyn Brabbins

Best Classical Album (Vocal or Choral Performance)
Winner: Berlioz: Les Troyens, Vocal Soloists, Choeur et Orchestre symphonique de Montréal, conductor Charles Dutoit

Other Nominees:
 Glitter and Be Gay, Tracy Dahl, Calgary Philharmonic Orchestra, conductor Mario Bernardi
 Janáček: Glagolitic Mass and Sinfonietta, Choeur et Orchestre symphonique de Montréal, conductor Charles Dutoit
 Pergolesi and Vivaldi: Stabat Mater, vocal soloists Catherine Robbin and Dorothea Röschmann, Les Violons du Roy, director Bernard Labadie
 Schubert: Schwanengesang D.957, baritone Kevin McMillan, piano Lev Natochenny

Best Album Design
Winner: Andrew MacNaughtan and Our Lady Peace, Naveed

Other Nominees:
 Nancy Boyle, Itch by Kim Mitchell
 Kevin Lynn, Project Twinkle by King Cobb Steelie
 Antoine Moonen and Mike Trebilcock, Starry by The Killjoys
 Megan Oldfield, Smilin' Buddha Cabaret by 54-40

Best Selling Album (Foreign or Domestic)
Winner: The Colour of My Love, Celine Dion

Other Nominees:
 August and Everything After, Counting Crows
 Day For Night, The Tragically Hip
 The Sign, Ace of Base
 Vs., Pearl Jam

Best Mainstream Jazz Album
Winner: Free Trade, Free Trade

Other Nominees:
 Bill, Please, Lorne Lofsky
 I Thought About You..., Ranee Lee
 Overtime, Rob McConnell and The Boss Brass
 The Water Is Wide, Jane Bunnett

Best Contemporary Jazz Album
Winner: The Merlin Factor, Jim Hillman and The Merlin Factor

Other Nominees:
 Carpathian Blues, John Stetch
 Dual Vision, Joe Sealy and Paul Novotny
 Hymn to the Earth, Sonny Greenwich
 We Were Talking, Mark Duggan

Best Roots & Traditional Album
Winner: The Mask and Mirror, Loreena McKennitt

Other Nominees:
 The Assassin's Apprentice, Stephen Fearing
 Driver, Ferron
 La Mistrine, La Bottine Souriante
 Turbulent Indigo, Joni Mitchell

Best Alternative Album
Winner: Shiver, Rose Chronicles

Other Nominees:
 Forever Again, Eric's Trip
 Naveed, Our Lady Peace
 Project Twinkle, King Cobb Steelie
 Smilin' Buddha Cabaret, 54-40
 Twice Removed, Sloan

Best Blues/Gospel Album
Winner: Joy To The World - Jubilation V, Montreal Jubilation Gospel Choir

Other Nominees:
 Good Times Guaranteed, Downchild Blues Band
 Home Is Where the Harp Is Live, Harpdog Brown and The Bloodhounds
 Just Gettin' Started, Rita Chiarelli
 Welcome Back, John Ellison

Best Selling Francophone Album
Winner: Coup de tête, Roch Voisine

Other Nominees:
 Déchaînée, France D'Amour
 Jehanne Blouin chante Noël, Jehanne Blouin
 Obsession, Éric Lapointe
 Y, Lynda Lemay

Best Hard Rock Album
Winner: Suffersystem, Monster Voodoo Machine

Other Nominees:
 Get Down, Malhavoc
 Millennium, Front Line Assembly
 Prototype, Varga
 Purge, Econoline Crush

Nominated and winning releases

Single of the Year
Winner: "Could I Be Your Girl", Jann Arden

Other Nominees:
 "Mmm Mmm Mmm Mmm", Crash Test Dummies
 "The Power of Love", Celine Dion
 "Please Forgive Me", Bryan Adams
 "Push", Moist

Best Classical Composition
Winner: "Sketches From Natal", Malcolm Forsyth with CBC Vancouver Orchestra

Other Nominees:
 "From the Eastern Gate", Alexina Louie, Erica Goodman Plays Canadian Harp Music
 "Iridescence", Chris Harman, Iridescence by Espirit Orchestra
 "Missa Brevis No. 11 Sancti Johannis Baptistae", Healey Willan - Healey Willan Masses & Motets by The Choirs of St. Mary Magdalene Church
 "Sonata Rhapsody for Viola & Piano", Jean Coulthard - A Portrait of the Viola by Steven Dann and Bruce Vogt

Best Rap Recording
Winner: Certified, Ghetto Concept

Other Nominees:
 Chi-Litchi-Latchi-Low, Freaks of Reality
 Naaah, Dis Kid Can't Be from Canada?!!, Maestro Fresh-Wes
 Really Livin', Rascalz
 Subliminal Simulation, Dream Warriors

Best R&B/Soul Recording
Winner: "First Impression For The Bottom Jigglers", Bass Is Base

Other Nominees:
 "I Had a Dream", Carol Medina
 "Key to My Heart", The Earthtones
 "Love T.K.O.", The Nylons
 "Smooth & Soft", Gentlemen X

Best Music of Aboriginal Canada Recording
Winner: Arctic Rose, Susan Aglukark

Other Nominees:
 Akua Tuta, Kashtin
 Blue Voice/New Voice, Jani Lauzon
 Music for the Native Americans, Robbie Robertson and The Red Road Ensemble
 No Regrets, Tom Jackson

Best Reggae Recording
Winner: "Class and Credential", Carla Marshall

Other Nominees:
 "A Love Thang", Tanya Mullings
 "Lazah Current", Lazah Current
 "Smokin' the Goats", One
 "The Sound", Fujahtive

Best Global Recording
Winner: Africa +, Eval Manigat

Other Nominees:
 Dancing on the Moon Contigo, Oscar Lopez
 Indiscretion, Djole
 Nene, Alpha Yaya Diallo
 Nine-Fold Heart, The Lee Pui Ming Ensemble

Best Dance Recording
Winner: Higher Love (Club Mix), Capital Sound

Other Nominees:
 "Could I Be Your Girl", Jann Arden
 "In the Night", Capital Sound
 "Music Is My Life", Temperance
 "Pure (You're Touching Me)", West End Girls

Best Video
Winner: Lyne Charlebois, "Tunnel of Trees" by Gogh Van Go

Other Nominees:
 Curtis Wehrfritz, "Bad Timing" by Blue Rodeo
 Jeth Weinrich, "Blame Your Parents" by 54-40
 Jeth Weinrich, "Insensitive" by Jann Arden
 Brenton Spencer, "Push" by Moist

References

External links
Juno Awards site

1995
1995 music awards
1995 in Canadian music
Culture of Hamilton, Ontario